John Gustav Thompson (June 22, 1877 – March 28, 1958) was a pitcher in Major League Baseball. He played for the Pittsburgh Pirates and St. Louis Cardinals. 

After his professional baseball career ended, Thompson moved to Kalispell, Montana around 1909 with his wife who was from Kalispell and remained there until his death nearly 50 years later in 1958. He was called "the father of baseball in Kalispell". He ran a pool hall, cigar store and a sports bar.

References

External links

1877 births
1958 deaths
Major League Baseball pitchers
Pittsburgh Pirates players
St. Louis Cardinals players
Baseball players from Iowa
Grinnell Pioneers baseball players
Helena Senators players
Boise Fruit Pickers players
Omaha Rourkes players
Aberdeen Grays players
Aberdeen Harbor Grays players
Seattle Turks players
Seattle Giants players
People from Humboldt, Iowa